The Colorado Democratic Party is the affiliate of the Democratic Party in the U.S. state of Colorado. Morgan Carroll serves as its chair.

The governing body of the party is the State Central Committee, which consists of the chair and vice chair of the county Democratic Party in each of Colorado's 64 counties and "bonus" members for larger counties. In each odd-numbered year, county parties elect officers in February followed by the state party which elects its officers in March. It is currently the dominant party in the state, controlling both of the state's U.S. Senate seats and all statewide executive offices, including the governorship, as well as supermajorities in both chambers of the legislature and a majority of its U.S. House districts.

Responsibilities
The Colorado Democratic Party manages and oversees statewide coordinated campaigns and is responsible for arranging and staging the state convention in Presidential years and the state assembly every two years. The state convention selects delegates to the Democratic National Convention and Colorado's Presidential electors. The state's assemblies designate candidates for statewide, congressional, district attorneys, state legislative and county offices, including the offices of Governor, Attorney-General, Colorado, Treasurer, C.U. Regent At-Large, and United States Senator. The party also adopts its platform at the state convention.

Principles
Based on their 2010 party platform, it is Democratic Party of Colorado's goal to respect all people, no matter of race, religion, sex, or ethnicity and pledge to them that they will build and maintain a nation that is secure and respected worldwide. With that in mind, the Colorado Democratic party promises to maintain the same, high standards for all international relations by supporting the equal right of all people to have freedom of expression, religion and the pursuit of happiness. Additionally, they promise a quality public education, a clean and safe environment, a healthy future, and a fair living wage. It is their goal to create an ethical government and society that is fair, open and accountable to all people. They vow to accept fundamental responsibility to all future generations and to pursue only policies that are sustainable and maintain or improve global well-being.

Current elected officials
Democrats hold all of the state's five statewide offices, a majority in the Colorado House of Representatives and a majority in the Colorado Senate. The party also holds both of the state's U.S. Senate seats and five of its eight U.S. House of Representatives seats.

Members of Congress

U.S. Senate

U.S. House of Representatives

Statewide offices

Legislative leadership
 President of the Senate: Steve Fenberg
 Senate Majority Leader: Dominick Moreno
 Speaker of the House: Julie McCluskie
  House Majority Leader: Monica Duran

Municipal
The following Democrats hold prominent mayoralties in Colorado:

 Denver: Michael Hancock
 Fort Collins: Jennifer Arndt
 Boulder: Aaron Brockett

Election results

Presidential

Gubernatorial

See also
 Buie Seawell, former CDP chair
 Colorado Republican Party
 Political party strength in Colorado
Politics of Colorado
 Elections in Colorado
Government of Colorado

References

Further reading

External links
 Colorado Democratic Party 

 
Democratic Party (United States) by state
Politics of Colorado
Democratic